Gale College (also Galesville University and Marynook) was a private college in Galesville, Wisconsin. It was founded by George Gale, opening in 1854 and closed in 1939. Several religious denominations used the facilities as a college and later as a training school.

History
Judge George Gale went to college at the University of Vermont and moved to the western frontier in La Crosse, Wisconsin in the early 1850s. After finding little interest in starting a college in La Crosse, he bought 2000 acres to start Galesville at a choice spot for his upcoming university. The state of Wisconsin chartered the school in 1854 as "Galesville University" and he held the first classes in the county courthouse in Galesville. The first class had 16 students including Gale's son George Gale Jr. Old Main was completed in 1862 and the campus becomes occupied in 1863.  Gale ran the nonsectarian college until 1865 and the school floundered while his health deteriorated during his involvement in the American Civil War.

In 1865, the Methodist Episcopal Church took over the school and it held classes until 1871. The Presbyterians took over until 1901 and changed the name to Gale College in the 1890s. The Synod of the Norwegian Evangelical Lutheran Church in America purchased the college in 1901. In 1915, they built a new dormitory and gymnasium. They constructed a new heating building in 1921. The Lutherans suspended the school for the 1938-9 school year because of too small enrollment and closed it permanently in June 1939.

The Society of Mary, Province of St. Louis purchased the buildings and 20 acres of land in 1941 for $10,000. Its buildings included two dormitories, the main building, and a heat building.  The Catholic order used the buildings to train novitiate brothers and priests. They named the school Marynook and operated the novitiate before it became a retreat in 1973. It operated as a retreat until June 1994 when the city of Galesville purchased it for $150,000. The city granted a 50-year lease in 2000 to the Garden of Eden Preservation Society.

Founder's Day
Throughout the school's varied history, it held a "Founders Day" celebration on June 4. A wreath was usually placed at George Gale's tomb and the grounds were typically open to the public. The day celebrated Gale's founding of the school, his platting of Galesville, and his work to develop Trempealeau County.

Historic Place
Several buildings on the campus were listed as a historic district with the National Register of Historic Places on February 14, 1997.

Current use

The Old Main building is being restored by the Old Main Historical & Community Arts Center. The group rents out the building for events and holds fundraisers. Volunteers are compiling the history of the area, building a digital database and collecting local genealogy information. Another building is being used as a kindergarten.

Notable alumni

Marcellus Dorwin, politician
John Hamman, Marianist Brother, magician
Charles N. Herreid, politician
David L. Holcomb, politician
Merlin Hull, politician
John Ballard Rendall, educator and politician
Arnt O. Rhea, politician and educator
Elmore Y. Sarles, Governor of North Dakota
Hobart Stocking, politician
Albert Twesme, politician and jurist

See also
"A brief history of Galesville University, Gale College and Marynook" by Lucinda Oakland Morken.

References

External links

Old Main Historical & Community Arts Center

Defunct private universities and colleges in Wisconsin
Buildings and structures in Trempealeau County, Wisconsin
Educational institutions disestablished in 1939
Historic districts on the National Register of Historic Places in Wisconsin
National Register of Historic Places in Trempealeau County, Wisconsin
Educational institutions established in 1854
1854 establishments in Wisconsin
1939 disestablishments in Wisconsin
Lutheran universities and colleges in the United States